Rudno  is a village in the administrative district of Gmina Krzeszowice, within Kraków County, Lesser Poland Voivodeship, in southern Poland.

History
The village developed beneath the 14th century Tenczyn Castle, the seat of the Tęczyński family, turning increasingly into a ruin after a fire in the mid-18th century.

References

Rudno